Yaakov Bar-Shalom (May 11, 1941) is a researcher in tracking and sensor fusion.  His work is associated with MS-MTT (Multi-Sensor, Multi-Target Tracking) and IMM (interacting-multiple-model) estimator.

Early life and education
Yaakov Bar-Shalom was born in Romania and he emigrated to Israel with his family at the age of nineteen. He earned his Bachelor's and Master's degree both in Electrical Engineering from Technion in Haifa, Israel. Following this, he earned his Ph.D. from Princeton University under Stuart Schwartz.

Professional career
Currently, Yaakov Bar-Shalom is Board of Trustees Distinguished Professor of Electrical & Computer Engineering and the Marianne E. Klewin Professor in Engineering in University of Connecticut. He is the recipient of the 2012 Connecticut Medal of Technology for his work in improving the sensitivity of remote sensors used for surveillance in the presence of background noise or clutter.

Anthony J. DeMaria, recipient of the 2004 Connecticut Medal of Technology and Chief Scientist at Coherent-DEOS, LLC, has stated that Yaakov Bar-Shalom is regarded as the "chief architect of probability-based methods for estimating the paths of moving objects."

Bar-Shalom's research mainly focuses on Target Tracking Systems: Information extraction and fusion from remote sensors (radar, sonar, electrooptical) for tracking cooperative or non-cooperative targets by estimating their trajectories in the presence of disturbances like measurement errors, target maneuvers and interfering signals (false measurements or from detection from other targets). Bar-Shalom has so far published more than 550 papers, 8 books, 20 book chapters and has over 63,000 citations. Under his supervision, 38 Ph.D. have graduated in his  years career as a professor.

Awards and honors
Bar-Shalom is recipient of IEEE Control Systems Society Distinguished Member Award (1987); UConn AAUP Award for Excellence in Research (1988); J. Mignona Data Fusion Award from the DoD JDL Data Fusion Group (2002); IEEE Dennis J. Picard Medal for Radar Technologies and Applications (2008); Connecticut Medal of Technology (2012).

He has been listed by Microsoft Academic Search (top authors in engineering) as number one among the researchers in Aerospace Engineering based on the citations of his work (2012-2016).

Bar-Shalom is also the recipient of the 2015 ISIF Award for a Lifetime of Excellence in Information Fusion. This award has been renamed in 2016 as the Yaakov Bar-Shalom Award for a Lifetime of Excellence in Information Fusion.

References

External links
Yaakov Bar-Shalom
Workshop on Estimation, Tracking and Fusion: A Tribute to Yaakov Bar-Shalom, 2001
IEEE author bio
Estimation and Signal Processing Laboratory
University of Connecticut faculty bio

Living people
1941 births
American electrical engineers
Systems engineers
Control theorists
University of Connecticut faculty
Princeton University alumni
Israeli emigrants to the United States
Romanian emigrants to Israel
American Jews
Technion – Israel Institute of Technology alumni
Israeli electrical engineers
Fellow Members of the IEEE